Sergiu Moraru (10 October 1946 in Obreja Veche, Fălești, Moldavian SSR - 21 May 1996, Chișinău, Moldova) was a folklorist from the Republic of Moldova.

Works 

 Ciugur, mugur, mugurele : Ghicitori (1977)
 Poetica liricii popular moldoveneşti (1978)
 Lumea o face, lumea o desface: Ghicitori popular moldoveneşti (1982)
 Speciile folclorice şi realitatea istorică (1985)
 Ştefan cel Mare : Legende, balade, portrete literare (1989)
 Vasile Lupu în folclor şi literatura (1992)
 Folclor din Ţara Fagilor (1993)

References

Relevant literature
 Niţă-Cocieru, Mariana. "Contribuția etnologului Sergiu Moraru la dezvoltarea folcloristicii din Basarabia–itinerar biografic și științific." In Sergiu Moraru: 75 de ani de la naștere, 7-15. 2021.

External links 
 In memoriam: etnologul Sergiu Moraru - 70 ani de la naștere. (By Mariana Cocieru)
 Personalitati Fălești - MEDIAPUBLIC.MD
 Moraru, Sergiu - Catalog BNRM

1946 births
1996 deaths
People from Fălești District
Moldovan writers
Moldovan male writers
Moldovan folklorists